Sant’Eligio Maggiore is a church in Naples, southern Italy. It is located near Piazza Mercato (Market Square), and was built during the reign of Charles of Anjou by the same congregation that built the nearby Sant’Eligio hospital in 1270. It is the first church built in Naples by the Angevin dynasty and therefore the first one in Gotico Angioiano style. 

The arched passageway that opens onto Piazza Mercato is through the original façade of the church and has since been incorporated into the structure of the ancient hospital.  Many of the lines of the original structure came to light in the course of restoration after the  bombardments of the  World War II.

References

External links

Eligio Maggiore
1270 establishments in Europe
13th-century establishments in the Kingdom of Sicily
Gothic architecture in Naples
13th-century Roman Catholic church buildings in Italy